Thomas Jones (1810 – 29 November 1875) was a Welsh librarian, who was librarian of Chetham's Library in Manchester from 1845 to 1875.

Life
Jones, from Margam in south Wales, was born in 1810 and educated at Cowbridge grammar school before attending Jesus College, Oxford, between 1827 and 1832.  After obtaining his Bachelor of Arts degree, he turned to working with books (in preference to an earlier intention of becoming a priest).  He catalogued the Neath library in 1842 and was appointed as the librarian of Chetham's Library in Manchester in 1845.  Whilst he was in charge, the library more than doubled in size (from 19,000 to 40,000 volumes) with Jones obtaining some books through his personal influence.  His catalogue of 1862–63 (2 volumes) continued the earlier catalogues of Radcliffe and of Greswell (from 1791 and 1821 respectively).  He was described as "one who seemed designed by nature for the place and whose whole soul was in his work".  As well as the catalogues of the library's collections, he wrote a Catalogue of the collection of tracts for and against popery (published in and about the reign of James II) in the Manchester library founded by Humphrey Chetham (1859). He was elected as a Fellow of the Society of Antiquaries of London in 1866, and died on 29 November 1875.

References

1810 births
1875 deaths
Alumni of Jesus College, Oxford
Fellows of the Society of Antiquaries of London
Welsh librarians